The following is a list of rulers of the Kingdom of Gumma. Gumma was one of the kingdoms in the Gibe region of Ethiopia that emerged in the 18th century.

List of rulers of the Gibe Kingdom of Gumma

Source: Based on C. F. Beckingham and G. W. B. Huntingford, Some Records of Ethiopia, 1593-1646 (London: Hakluyt Society, 1954), p. lxxxvif

See also
Monarchies of Ethiopia
Rulers and heads of state of Ethiopia

Gibe Guma rulers
Gibe Guma rulers
 Guma